The Roman Catholic Prefecture Apostolic of Upper Kassai was a mission territory in the Belgian Congo. It was erected as a simple mission in 1901, and detached, as a prefecture Apostolic, from the Vicariate of Belgian Congo, on 20 August 1901.

Location
The residence of the prefect Apostolic was the mission of St. Joseph de Luluabourg, situated a few miles to the south of the station of the Belgian colony of Luluabourg (now Kananga), in the district of Lualaba-Kassai, the chief town of which was Lusambo, residence of the district commissioner. The prefecture, at the time of its creation, comprised almost all the Lualaba-Kassai district. It was bounded on the north by the Vicariate of Belgian Congo (district of the Equateur); on the east by the same vicariate (territory of the Katanga Company); on the south by Portuguese Congo; on the west by the Lubue River. In 1908 it was enlarged by taking as its boundaries on the east the left bank of the Lualaba River, and on the west the Prefecture Apostolic of Kwango, which was in the charge of the Jesuits.

The local languages were those of the Bena Lulua, the Baluba (Tshiluba language), Bena Kanioka, the Batetela, the Bakuba, the Bakete, and the Balunda.

Religious orders
Just one religious order of men was engaged in evangelization there, the Congregation of the Immaculate Heart of Mary of Scheut (Brussels), and a single religious order of women, the Sisters of Charity of Ghent.

Residences
After 15 November 1891, when Père Cambier arrived alone at Luluabourg to commence the evangelization of these regions, eleven residences were established. In order of their foundation, they were:
(1) St-Joseph de Luluabourg;
(2) Mérode Salvator (Kala Kafumba);
(3) St-Trudon de Lusambo;
(4) Hemptinne St-Bénoit;
(5) Tielen St-Jacques;
(6) Bena Makima St-Victorien;
(7) St-Antoine de Lusambo;
(8) Lusambo;
(9) Udemba;
(10) Pangu-hopital;
(11) Liège-Sacrés-Coeurs at Katanga.

Besides these larger residences, tended by at least three priests or two priests and a lay brother, fermes-chapelles (or Christian villages) were established in the prefecture.

First leader
The first Prefect Apostolic of Upper Kassai was Emeri Cambier, born at Flobecq in the Belgian province of Hainaut, 2 January 1865. He was ordained priest 20 November 1887, arrived in the Congo in 1888, at Luluabourg in 1891, and in 1904 was placed at the head of the newly created prefecture Apostolic. The King of Belgium named him an officer of the Royal Order of the Lion in recognition of his services. He died on 29 September 1943, at Namur.

References

Attribution
 The entry cites:
Battandier, Annuaire pontificale catholique (Paris, 1910);
Missiones catholicae (Rome, 1910)

Upper Kassai
History of the Democratic Republic of the Congo